HMS Grecian was the former Revenue cutter Dolphin, launched at Cowes in 1799, that the Royal Navy purchased in 1821 and renamed. She captured a pirate schooner in 1823. The Royal Navy sold Grecian in 1828.

Career

Revenue cutter
In late April 1806 Dolphin detained and sent into Penzance Bella, Kallenberg, master, which had been sailing from Baltimore to Bremen. Bella was released and sent on her way on 20 June.

In May Dolphin detained and sent into Penzance the Danish vessel Fortuna, Peterson, master.

On 26 September 1810 Dolphin came upon Valiant, Owen, master, off Land's End. Valiant was waterlogged and in a sinking state. She had been sailing from Bangor to London, and Dolphin brought her into Mount's Bay. There Valiant unloaded her cargo.{{efn|Valiant, of 123 tons burthen, E.Owen, master, W.Owen, owner, had been launched at Beaumaris in 1799.<ref>[https://hdl.handle.net/2027/mdp.39015005676393?urlappend=%3Bseq=497 Lloyd's Register LR, (1810), Seq.№V10.]</ref>}}

On 18 December 1812 Dolphin towed Ann into Mount's Bay, Ann, Ancell, master, had been on her way from London to  when she lost her mainmast and rudder.

Royal Navy
The Admiralty purchased Dolphin and renamed her HMS Grecian. Lieutenant John Cawley commissioned Grecian on 20 November 1821 for the Jamaica Station.

On 20 March 1823 Grecian captured the pirate schooner Gata, a felucca, and two boats.

 suffered damage from stranding in May 1823 in the Gulf of Mexico. She might have been lost if Grecian had not rendered assistance.

On 23 May 1824 Grecian arrived at Jamaica with $100,000 that she had carried from Santa Martha (Gran Colombia).

FateGrecian'' was paid off on 11 May 1825.

The "Principal Officers and Commissioners of His Majesty's Navy" offered the "Grecian cutter, of 145 tons", lying at Portsmouth, for sale on 11 July 1827. She was sold to Mr. Freake, but the sale was cancelled when he was declared insane. The Commissioners offered her again on 18 January 1828. She was sold for £300 to Samuel Phillips.

Notes, citations, and references
Notes

Citations

References
 
  
 

1799 ships
Cutters of the Royal Navy